CMPC is a Chilean pulp and paper company, being the biggest worldwide according Forbes Global 2000 2018 ranking. It is engaged in integrated forest industry, which operates as a holding company through four business centers: Forestry, Pulp, Paper and Paper Products, and Tissue. Each of these areas can function independently, being in the holding company for overall coordination and financial management of these businesses. Supplies, computer systems and other related administrative support, are centralized in CMPC SA Shared Services.
	
The company has operations in Chile, Argentina, Brazil, Peru, Colombia, Mexico, Ecuador, and Uruguay and its main competitors are Suzano (based in Brazil), Arauco (based in Chile), APRIL (based in Indonesia) and Södra (based in Sweden).

References 

Pulp and paper companies of Chile
Companies based in Santiago
Holding companies established in 1920
Manufacturing companies established in 1920
Renewable resource companies established in 1920
Companies listed on the Santiago Stock Exchange
Chilean companies established in 1920